Ameerpet is a village and panchayat in Ranga Reddy district, Telangana, India. It falls under Maheswaram mandal.

References

Villages in Ranga Reddy district